Kibatalia maingayi is a tree in the family Apocynaceae.

Description
The bark is pale brown, dark grey or whitish. Inflorescences bear up to 25 flowers. The flowers feature a white or pale yellow corolla.

Distribution and habitat
Kibatalia maingayi is native to Thailand, Peninsular Malaysia, Singapore, Sumatra, Borneo and the Philippines. Its habitat is lowland and lower montane forests.

References

maingayi
Trees of Thailand
Trees of Malesia
Plants described in 1882